Eric David Kroll (born October 23, 1946) is an American photojournalist,  fetish photographer, erotica historian, and book editor.

Work

Eric Kroll's commercial work began in Taos, New Mexico in 1969, when he partnered with friend Sam Bruskin to open a gallery. He worked as a photo journalist in New York from 1971 to 1994. 

Kroll worked and lived in many worlds at once; fashion, music, and the art and film scenes. During the 70s and 80s he photographed every day scenes from his personal life, photographed celebrities, fashion and the New York social scene for Elle Magazine, Vogue, The New York Times and Der Spiegel. He photographed personalities and artists such as Madonna, Andy Warhol, Keith Haring, and Korean video artist Nam June Paik. In 1976 he published "Sex Objects," with a grant from the New York State Council of the Arts grant, a book documenting sex workers across America. In the early 1980s he turned away from portrait photography with a series title "Fetish Girls" (1994), which remains one of the best selling books in the publisher Taschen's history. Kroll worked with Benedikt Taschen from 1993-2007 as photo editor and erotica historian. 

Eric Kroll has published collections ("Fetish Girls" and "Beauty Parade"), composed introductions for influential works such as the compiled two-volume "Bizarre" collection and some Taschen folios. Many of Kroll's photographs refer to and pay homage to his predecessors, Eric Stanton and John Willie, as well the art of Man Ray, and Marcel Duchamp.

Kroll also curated exhibitions including "Warhol: From Dylan to Duchamp," an exhibition of photographs documenting Warhol's factory era. Photographers included Annie Leibovitz, Robert Mapplethorpe, Helmut Newton, Cecil Beaton, actor Dennis Hopper, and others. The Warhol Museum in Pittsburgh loaned Firestone Gallery Andy Warhol's "Screen Tests" of both Bob Dylan and Marcel Duchamp for the show.

Books by Eric Kroll
 “Sex Objects”, Addison House, 1977.
 "Fetish Girls", Taschen, 1994.
 "Beauty Parade", Taschen, 1997.
 "The Transformations of Gwen", NBM Publishing, 2000.
 "The Transformations of Gwen, Volume 2", NBM Publishing, 2001. 
 "Warhol: Dylan to Duchamp", Eric Firestone, 2010. 
 "THE NEW YORK YEARS 1971 to 1994", Timeless Edition, France 2022

Books edited by Eric Kroll
 "The Art of Eric Stanton", a volume dedicated to the artwork of Eric Stanton, Taschen, 1996.
 "The Wonderful World of Bill Ward, King of the Glamour Girls", Taschen, 2003. 
 "The New Erotic Photography", Taschen, 2007. Co-edited with Dian Hanson.

Collections
USC Fisher Museum of Art
Smithsonian American Art Museum, Washington, D.C
World Erotic Art Museum
Greer Lankton Archives Museum
Mattress Factory, Pittsburgh, PA

References

External links
 Vintage Prints
 Etherton Gallery

Fetish photographers
BDSM photographers
1946 births
Living people
American erotic photographers